Morocelí is a municipality in the Honduran department of El Paraíso.

The town houses a cigar factory operated by Nestor Plasencia.

Municipalities of the El Paraíso Department